is an association football and rugby union stadium located in Kitakyushu, Fukuoka Prefecture, Japan. It has a capacity of 15,300, and it opened on 18 February 2017 with a rugby union match. Giravanz Kitakyushu have been tenants since 2017. It has been called Mikuni World Stadium Kitakyushu for the naming rights.

On 16 September 2019 the Welsh national rugby team practised at this stadium in front of a full house – officially 15,300 seated, with more standing. This was a pre-event for the Rugby World Cup 2019 held in Japan.

On 25 June 2022, Japan national rugby union team hosted a test match against Uruguay.

References

External links
 Mikuni Stadium Home Page
 StadiumDB profile

Football venues in Japan
Rugby union stadiums in Japan
2017 establishments in Japan
Sports venues completed in 2017
Rugby in Kyushu
Giravanz Kitakyushu